Samina may refer to:

 MS Express Samina, a ferry, built in 1966, that collided with a rock in 2000
 Mesothen samina, a moth species

Places
 Samina (river), of Liechtenstein and Austria, tributary of the Ill
 Samina (Andoma), a tributary of the Andoma, Vologda Oblast, Russia
 Samina, Punjab, a town and union council in the Punjab province of Pakistan

Other
Samina (name)